Panamá Viejo (English: "Old Panama"), also known as Panamá la Vieja, is the remaining part of the original Panama City, the former capital of Panama, which was destroyed in 1671 by the Welsh privateer Henry Morgan. It is located in the suburbs of the current capital. Together with the historical district of Panamá, it has been a World Heritage Site since 1997.

History
 A settlement (originally known as Castilla del Oro) was founded on August 15, 1519 by Pedro Arias Dávila and another 100 inhabitants.  At the time, it was the first permanent European settlement on the Pacific Ocean, replacing the two cities of Santa María la Antigüa del Darién and Acla. Two years later, in 1521, the settlement was promoted to the status of city by a royal decree and was given a coat of arms by Charles V of Spain, forming a new cabildo. Shortly after its creation the city became a starting point for various expeditions in Peru and an important base where gold and silver were sent to Spain.

From 1520 some Genoese merchants ruled the commerce and the Port of Old Panama (Panamá Viejo) on the Pacific Ocean for a century, thanks to a concession given by the Spaniards, who had the Republic of Genoa as allies.

Between 1586 and 1587 already there were 11 Italians in Panama, for naturalization and the right to stay in Panama. According to a census around 1587, Panama City had 548 inhabitants (some of them descendants of the first Genoese settlers), of whom 53 were foreigners and of these 18 were Italians.

In 1539 and 1563, the city suffered a number of fires which destroyed parts of it but did not impede the city's development. In 1610, the city reached a population of 5,000, with 500 houses, as well as convents, chapels, a hospital and a cathedral.

At the beginning of the 17th century, the city was attacked several times by pirates and by indigenous people from Darién. On 2 May 1620, an earthquake damaged many buildings in the city. On 21 February 1644, the Great Fire destroyed 83 religious buildings, including the cathedral. At this time, there were 8,000 people living in the city.

In 1670, the city counted 10,000 inhabitants. On 28 January 1671, the Welsh privateer Henry Morgan attacked the city with 1,400 men, marching from the Caribbean coast across the jungle. Morgan's force defeated the city's militia then proceeded to sack Panamá. Either Morgan and his army started a fire that burned the city or the Captain General Emanuel Gonzalez Revilla ordered the explosion of the gunpowder magazines. Either way, the resulting fire destroyed the city. Morgan's attack caused the loss of thousands of lives and Panamá had to be rebuilt a few kilometres to the west on a new site (the current one).

Henry Morgan was arrested but, after proving he knew nothing of the recently completed Treaty of Madrid which ended hostilities between England and Spain, was subsequently freed and later rewarded.

UNESCO added Panamá Viejo to the World Heritage list in 1997.  It justified its inclusion on the grounds that the site is the "oldest continuously occupied European settlement in the Pacific coast of the Americas."

Popular culture
This UNESCO World Heritage Site was the Pit Stop of the 19th season of The Amazing Race.

The reward feast from a reward challenge in the 7th season of the CBS show Survivor was held at this place.

Gallery

References

External links

UNESCO description list
Patronato Panama Viejo

History of Panama City
Buildings and structures in Panama City
Archaeological sites in Panama
Former populated places in Panama
Populated places established in 1519
1519 establishments in North America
1519 establishments in the Spanish Empire
16th century in Central America
Tourist attractions in Panama City
World Heritage Sites in Panama